Biórków Mały  is a village in the administrative district of Gmina Koniusza, within Proszowice County, Lesser Poland Voivodeship, in southern Poland.

References

Villages in Proszowice County